The history of the Jews in Mongolia starts with the 19th century trade routes between Siberian-Jewish merchants and the Mongolians. This resulted in some Jewish families entering Mongolia.

History
Before 1920, most Jews that arrived in Mongolia were of Russian background, and had fled the chaos of the Russian Civil War. Some were even elevated to Mongolian nobility as was the case of Baron Zanzer who changed his name in honour of Zanabazar, the first Bogd Khan, the name and title become one in Mongolia and defined the identity of the person. The community was annihilated in 1921 by White Russians under the leadership of Baron Roman von Ungern-Sternberg, who pursued even fleeing Jews and killed everyone of the 600 Jews: men, women & children. In 1926, Ulaanbaatar had a population of 600 Russian Jews who had attempted to leave Outer Mongolia, which was a Soviet satellite at the time.

After the breakup of the Soviet Union, a number of Jewish citizens left the country in search of better economic opportunities. Some left for Israel, which had a visa agreement with Mongolia.

Present day
Many Israeli tourists visit Mongolia each summer and the two countries have a mutual agreement for visa exemptions. Despite that, the Jewish population numbers less than 100. In 2003, the Mongol-Jewish Cooperation was formed, and its website answers questions about subjects such as Judaism and Israel. The organization's head, Sumati Luvsandendev, has said, "there are enough fingers on two hands to count all Jews who live here." The closest Jewish community with a rabbi is the Siberian city of Irkutsk, whose Chief Rabbi Aharon Wagner seeks to maintain close contact with the neighboring Mongolian Jewish community.

See also
History of the Jews in Central Asia
History of the Jews in Russia
History of the Jews in China

References

External links
Jewish virtual tour-Mongolia

Mongolia
Jewish
Judaism
Jews and Judaism in Mongolia
Mongolia